The Vegas Golden Knights are a professional ice hockey expansion team based in Las Vegas, Nevada. The team began play in the 2017–18 NHL season, a member of the Pacific Division of the Western Conference of the National Hockey League (NHL). The team is owned by Black Knight Sports & Entertainment, a consortium led by Bill Foley, and plays its home games at T-Mobile Arena on the Las Vegas Strip in Paradise, Nevada. George McPhee was named the first general manager in franchise history on July 13, 2016.

General managers

Notes
 A running total of the number of general managers of the franchise. Thus any general manager who has two or more separate terms as general manager is only counted once.

See also
List of NHL general managers

References

Vegas Golden Knights general managers
Vegas Golden Knights executives
General managers
Vegas Golden Knights